Hypsopygia intermedialis, the red-shawled moth, is a species of snout moth in the genus Hypsopygia. It is found in the United States, southern Canada and Haiti.

The wingspan is about 16 mm. The forewings are dark brownish red with black lines bordered with pale yellow. The hindwings are light brownish gray basally, with darker shading distally. Adults are on wing in June and July.

References

Moths described in 1862
Pyralini